The Welsh School of Architectural Glass is a department of Swansea Metropolitan University which offers BAs and MA courses in architectural stained glass.

The school was founded in 1935, when Howard Martin, who ran a glass company was invited by the Swansea Art College to run an evening class.  The school has  graduates working on cathedrals, theatres and public buildings all over the world.

References

External links
Welsh School of Architectural Glass (official site)

Swansea Metropolitan University